The Survivalist is a 2021 American action thriller film directed by Jon Keeyes and written by Matthew Rogers starring Jonathan Rhys Meyers and John Malkovich.

It was released in the United States on October 1, 2021, by Quiver Distribution.

Plot
In a world decimated by the Delta variant of the COVID-19 virus, Sarah Street is relentlessly hunted by religious fanatic Aaron Ramsey who miraculously survived the virus. Aaron seeks Sarah because she is supposed to be immune to the virus and could thus hold the key to a potential cure. Escaping a refugee camp in Pennsylvania where 20,000 people died of the virus with her brother, who sacrifices himself to protect her, Sarah makes her way to the home of Ben Grant, a former FBI cartographer turned survivalist following the murder of his father. Ben protects Sarah against Aaron and his marauders, slowly killing them all off. However, Sarah eventually reveals that she's not actually immune: she's simply an asymptomatic carrier of the virus. After Sarah's presence infected the refugee camp, the doctors had lied about her immunity rather than admitting to their mistake. Ben eventually defeats Aaron who is then killed by Sarah. Ben and Sarah decide to leave and search for other survivors who might be working on a cure, particularly as Ben has likely caught the virus himself due to his extended contact with Sarah.

Cast
Jonathan Rhys Meyers as Ben Grant
John Malkovich as Aaron Neville Ramsey 
Ruby Modine as Sarah Street
Jenna Leigh Green as Marley Harrelson
Julian Sands as Heath Grant 
Thaddeus Street as Matthew Ramirez
Jon Orsini as Owen Hanley
Rob Dubar as Jackson Everett
Obi Abili as John Larsson
Simon Phillips as Danny
Tom Pecinka as Guy Street (Sarah's brother)
Lori Petty as Radio Operator (voice)

Production
Filming wrapped in December 2020.

Release
The Survivalist (2021) was released on VOD platforms on October 1, 2021. It made available on Redbox kiosks for DVD rental on October 1, 2021. It will be available at retailers on DVD and Blu-Ray on October 19, 2021.

Reception
Leslie Felperin of The Guardian awarded the film two stars out of five and wrote, "The palette of sludge and gravel doesn’t help and the performances represent no one’s best here, although it’s nice to see Rhys Meyers back in action after some decidedly low-profile movie roles."  Alistair Lawrence of Common Sense Media also awarded the film two stars out of five.

References

External links
 
 

2021 films
American action thriller films
2021 action thriller films
2020s English-language films
2020s American films